W.A.S.P. is an American heavy metal band from Los Angeles, was formed in February 4, 1982. The group originally consisted of vocalist and rhythm guitarist Blackie Lawless (real name Steven Duren), lead guitarist William "Randy" Piper, bassist Rik Fox (real name Richard Suligowski) and drummer Tony Richards. 

By the time they recorded their debut album, Lawless had taken over on bass and Chris Holmes had joined on lead guitar. 

Lawless is the last remaining original member of the group, which currently also features lead guitarist Doug Blair (in 1992 and 2001, and since 2006), bassist Mike Duda (since 1995) and drummer Aquiles Priester (since 2017).

History

1982–1990

W.A.S.P. evolved from Circus Circus shortly after bassist Rik Fox's addition to the band in February 4, 1982. The group's original lineup also included lead vocalist/rhythm guitarist Blackie Lawless, lead guitarist Randy Piper and drummer Tony Richards. By "the end of May", Fox had been dismissed from the group and replaced by Richards' former Dante Fox bandmate Don Costa. Around the same time, Piper also left "for a few months". Towards the end of the year, Costa left to join Ozzy Osbourne's touring band, at which point Lawless decided to switch to bass and bring back Piper on guitar. He was also joined by Chris Holmes.

The band released its first single "Animal (F**k Like a Beast)" in April 1984. This was followed in August by their self-titled full-length debut. Shortly after the album's release, Richards was replaced by former Keel drummer Steve Riley. The group released The Last Command in 1985, before Piper left in July 1986. Lawless subsequently switched back to guitar, with Johnny Rod (real name John Tumminello) leaving King Kobra to take over as bassist. Inside the Electric Circus followed in October, before Riley left during the subsequent tour to join L.A. Guns. He was replaced for future shows by a string of temporary substitutes.

By early 1988, W.A.S.P. had started working on its fourth studio album with Quiet Riot drummer Frankie Banali. By the time The Headless Children was released a year later, Banali had become a full-time member of the band. After a short tour, Holmes stepped back and eventually announced his departure from W.A.S.P. shortly after marrying Lita Ford in the summer of 1990; at the same time, the guitarist also claimed that both Rod and Banali had also departed.

1990–2002
After the departure of Chris Holmes, Blackie Lawless began recording The Crimson Idol with guitarist Bob Kulick and continuing drummer Frankie Banali. The album was intended to be released under the moniker "Blackie Lawless and W.A.S.P.", with the eponymous frontman performing vocals, bass and rhythm guitar. Banali recorded only half the album, before stepping back following his mother's death in November 1990. He was replaced by former Impellitteri drummer Stet Howland in January 1991. Upon the album's completion, a new touring lineup of Lawless, Howland, new guitarist Dan McCade and returning bassist Johnny Rod was announced for May and June shows. For a North American tour from July to November, McDade was replaced by Doug Blair.

In September 1993, Lawless announced that he was disbanding W.A.S.P., with a final single "Sunset and Babylon" (recorded during The Crimson Idol sessions) to be released the following month. Throughout 1994, the frontman worked on a new album intended to be his solo debut. When it was eventually released in June 1995, however, Still Not Black Enough was credited to W.A.S.P. The album was not released outside of Japan and Europe until over a year later, when it was announced that Chris Holmes had returned to the band. When the follow-up Kill Fuck Die was released in April 1997, it was revealed that the guitarist and Lawless had been working together "under a blanket of fierce secrecy" since August 1995. The album also featured new bassist Mike Duda and returning drummer Stet Howland.

W.A.S.P.'s lineup remained stable for another four years, spawning one more studio album in Helldorado. During the recording of Unholy Terror, the band started working with drummer Frankie Banali again for certain sessions, as Howland was not available all the time. Shortly after the album's release in April 2001, rumours began to circulate that Holmes had left the band for a second time. His departure was later confirmed by Lawless in June, with Doug Blair temporarily returning to take his place on tour. At the end of July, the group announced former Tuff guitarist Darrell Roberts as Holmes' permanent replacement after months of rumours.

Since 2002
Roberts debuted on 2002's Dying for the World, which was followed in 2004 by The Neon God: Part 1 – The Rise and Part 2 – The Demise in 2004, all of which featured Banali on drums alongside Howland. In February 2006, Stet Howland announced that he had left W.A.S.P. the previous month on amicable terms. He was replaced for a run of shows by Patrick Johansson. In April, Larry Howe was announced as Howland's replacement, however a week later the group's management replied that this was not an official appointment. At the same time, it was revealed that Roberts had also left W.A.S.P. A few weeks later, Mike "Spud" Dupke and former touring member Doug Blair were announced as the band's new drummer and lead guitarist, respectively, the latter succeeding the earlier appointment of Mark Zavon.

With Blair and Dupke, W.A.S.P. released Babylon in 2009 and Golgotha in 2015, before the drummer left in July 2015. Johansson returned to fulfil a run of shows, before former Annihilator drummer Randy Black took over in September. By August 2017, Black had been replaced by Aquiles Priester.

Members

Current

Former

Backup

Timeline

Lineups

References

External links
W.A.S.P. official website

W.A.S.P.